Charles David may refer to:

 Charles David (architect) (1552–1650), French architect
 Charles David (company), a designer of leather goods
 Charles David (field hockey) (born 1968), Malaysian Olympic hockey player
 Charles Walter David Jr. (1917–1943), United States Coast Guard steward's mate awarded the Navy and Marine Corps Medal
 USCGC Charles David (WPC 1107)
 Charles Wendell David (1885–1984), American librarian
 Charlie David (born 1980), Canadian actor

See also